P115 may refer to:
 , a patrol boat of the Mexican Navy
 Boulton Paul P.115, a British trainer aircraft
 BRM P115, a Formula One racing car
 Papyrus 115, a biblical manuscript
 , a patrol boat of the Turkish Navy
 USO1, general vesicular transport factor p115
 Yamaha P-115, a portable digital piano
 P115, a state regional road in Latvia